The Art in Heaven Concert (full title Mike Oldfield The Art in Heaven Concert Live in Berlin) is a Mike Oldfield concert video taken from 2000 New Year's night (31 December 1999) concert at the Victory Column in Berlin, Germany, which is currently available on both CD and DVD.

Performance 
At the concert Oldfield performed pieces from his back catalogue, his then latest album The Millennium Bell and another piece titled "Art in Heaven". "Art in Heaven" begins with an excerpt from the first track of his The Songs of Distant Earth album ("In the Beginning"), and ends with "Ode to Joy" from Ludwig van Beethoven's Ninth Symphony. The rest of the piece was specially composed for the event and was later turned into "Thou Art in Heaven" on his next album Tres Lunas.

The concert was a few months after the Live Then & Now 1999 tour and Oldfield's last performance until 2006.

DVD track listing

Classic songs 
 "Tubular Bells" (Excerpts from part 1)
 "Portsmouth"
 "Moonlight Shadow"
 "Secrets"
 "Shadow on the Wall"

The Millennium Bell songs 
 "Sunlight" ("Sunlight Shining Through Cloud")
 "The Doges Palace"
 "Mastermind"
 "Broad" ("Broad Sunlit Uplands")
 "Liberation"
 "Amber Light"
 "The Millennium Bell"

Special features 
 "Art in Heaven" – Oldfield's 13-minute solo
 "The Making Of..." – documentary
 Interview with Mike Oldfield

Personnel 
 Mike Oldfield – guitars, keyboards
 Robyn Smith – conductor
 Adrian Thomas – keyboards, guitars
 Claire Nicolson – keyboards, guitar
 Carrie Melbourne – bass, Chapman Stick
 Fergus Gerrand – drums, percussion
 Jody Linscott – percussion
 Pepsi Demacque – vocals
 Miriam Stockley – vocals
 Nicola Emmanuelle – vocals
 David Serame – vocals
Also
 Symphony Orchestra State Academic Capella, Saint Petersburg
 The Glinka State Choir, Saint Petersburg
Production
 Gert Hof – director
 Egon Banghard – producer
 Achim Perleberg – producer

Sight & Sound version 
On 30 June 2008 Warner re-released the concert in a CD and DVD double pack as a part of their Sight & Sound, Classic Performance Live range.  The DVD is the same as the original release, with the CD being a reordered version of the concert, excluding the "Art in Heaven" 13 minute track.

CD track listing 
 "Tubular Bells"
 "Portsmouth"
 "Moonlight Shadow"
 "Secrets"
 "Shadow on the Wall"
 "Sunlight"
 "The Doges Palace"
 "Mastermind"
 "Broad"
 "Liberation"
 "Amber Light"
 "The Millennium Bell"

References

External links 
 

2000 films
Mike Oldfield video albums
2000 video albums
Live video albums
2008 live albums